Harlem 1 may refer to:
 Jester I Unit, a punishment facility in Texas and originally named Harlem 1 Unit
 Success Academy Harlem 1, a charter school in New York City